Petronella Gerardina "Nel" Roos-Lodder (4 April 1914 – 4 June 1996) was a Dutch discus thrower. She competed at 1948 Summer Olympics and finished in 13th place.

References

1914 births
1996 deaths
Athletes (track and field) at the 1948 Summer Olympics
Dutch female discus throwers
Olympic athletes of the Netherlands
Athletes from Amsterdam